No. 28 Squadron of the Royal Air Force operates the Puma and Chinook helicopters from RAF Benson.

History

First World War
No. 28 Squadron of the Royal Flying Corps was formed on 7 November 1915 at RAF Gosport. Initially it was a training squadron equipped with a variety of different aircraft, although in June 1916, it was also recorded as having home defence duties, for which it had a few Royal Aircraft Factory B.E.12s, although it lost this role in July that year. On 9 June, part of the squadron was split off to form the nucleus of the new 56 Squadron. In July 1917, 28 Squadron moved to Yatesbury in Wiltshire for conversion to the fighter role, receiving the Sopwith Camel from September 1917.

The squadron moved to France on 8 October 1917, and flew its first operational sortie on 20 October, during the Battle of Passchendaele, when 19 of the squadron's aircraft provided cover during an attack by Camels of 70 Squadron on a German airfield at Rumbeke, Belgium, with 28 Squadron claiming three German aircraft shot down. On 26 October, as a result of the Austro-German offensive against Italy at the Battle of Caporetto, the British government agreed to sent troops and aircraft to reinforce the Italians, and 28 Squadron was one of the squadrons ordered to Italy, arriving at Milan by rail on 12 November, with its aircraft uncrated and reassembled by 14 November. The squadron's aircraft flew escort missions for army cooperation patrols over the front lines, as well as for longer-range strategic reconnaissance missions and for bombing raids.

From February 1918, the squadron added attacks against enemy airfields to its duties, and in March, a flight of Bristol F.2 Fighters was attached to the squadron for long-range reconnaissance, although they were soon passed in to 34 Squadron. On 1 April 1918, the squadron became part of the newly established Royal Air Force. On 15 June 1918, Austria-Hungary launched a major offensive on the Italian front. As the weather on the sector of the front (on the Asiago plateau) held by British troops was too poor for air power to be useful, the RAF squadrons' efforts were diverted to help the Italians on the Piave front, where Austro-Hungarian forces had crossed the River Piave. All available British aircraft were employed against the Austro-Hungarian forces, and in particular against the crossings over the Piave, and when the offensive had been stopped, against the retreating Austro-Hungarian troops. On 27 October 1918, the Italians launched their final, successful, offensive of the war, at the Battle of Vittorio Veneto. RAF squadrons, including 28 Squadron, were employed in attacking the retreating Austro-Hungarian troops until the Armistice of Villa Giusti ended the fighting on 4 November.

By the end of the First World War, the squadron had claimed 111 enemy aircraft destroyed, with a further 24 driven down out of control. It numbered eleven flying aces among its ranks, with future Air Vice-Marshal Clifford MacKay McEwen, with 27 claims, being the squadron's leading scorer. Other aces included William George Barker (who claimed 22 of his total of 50 while with the squadron), Harold B. Hudson, James Hart Mitchell, Stanley Stanger, Arthur Cooper, Percy Wilson, Thomas Frederic Williams, and Joseph E. Hallonquist.

Inter war years
The squadron returned to Britain in February 1919, first to its old home at Yatesbury, then to Leighterton in Gloucestershire and to Eastleigh in Hampshire in October 1919. It was disbanded on 20 January 1920 at Eastleigh. On 1 April 1920, however, it was reformed at RAF Ambala in Northern India by renumbering 114 Squadron, an army cooperation squadron equipped with the Bristol F2b Fighter. The squadron operated over the North-West Frontier, moving to Kohat in December 1921. While the squadron had an authorised establishment of 12 aircraft, the actual number of aircraft possessed by the squadron was usually considerably less, with the squadron recorded as having 7 aircraft on 30 June 1922. Serviceability of the RAF's India-based aircraft was also poor, with many of the aircraft old and worn out. In an August 1922 report on the state of the RAF in India Air Vice Marshall John Salmond noted that of an authorised establishment of 70 aircraft in India, only 7 were operational, with aircraft flying without equipment essential to safety, and concluded that "...the Royal Air Force in India is to all intents and purposes non-existent as a fighting force at this date."

In April 1923, the squadron moved to Peshawar, with a detachment at Tank, and in January 1925, moved to RAF Quetta. As well as its normal duties, the squadron operated an experimental air mail service from Quetta to Shimla in 1925. In January 1927, the squadron returned to Ambala, where it remained based for the next 10 years. In September 1931, the squadron replaced its Bristol Fighters with Westland Wapitis. The squadron flew relief flights into Quetta after the city had been devastated by an earthquake on 31 May 1935. The squadron re-equipped again with the Hawker Audax during June 1936. In April 1937, the squadron was forward deployed to Manzai in response to an uprising by supporters of Mitza Ali Khan in Waziristan. The squadron returned to Ambala in July 1937, although it continued to maintain detachments at Miranshah. It moved to Kohat in March 1939.

Second World War

The squadron remained at Kohat, on the outbreak of the Second World War in Europe. It re-equipped with the Westland Lysander monoplane in September 1941. In early January 1942, as a response to the Japanese invasion of Burma, two of the squadron's Lysanders were sent to Port Blair in the Andaman Islands, with the remainder of the squadron preparing to move to Burma. Nineteen Lysanders reached Lashio in the Shan States on 26 January, with the squadron, together with the similarly equipped 1 Squadron, Indian Air Force, moved forward to Taungoo, and being fitted with racks to carry  bombs for direct support of the Army. On 2 February 1942, two Lysanders set out from Mingaladon carrying Lieutenant-General Thomas Hutton, General Officer Commanding Burma Command and his aide to Lashio, in the first part of Hutton's planned journey to Chungking to meet Chinese leader Chiang Kai-Shek. The two aircraft became lost however and the Lysander carrying Hutton crashed and caught fire. While Hutton managed to escape the burning aircraft, the pilot, Flight lieutenant E. W. Tate was badly injured and Hutton was unable to free him, with Tate dying from his wounds six days later. The squadron's Lysanders carried out a number of bombing attacks against Japanese-held airfields, rail targets, river traffic and troops, but losses were heavy, and the squadron was ordered to withdraw back to India on 17 February, leaving a detachment of three Lysanders behind in Burma. The two aircraft detached to the Andaman Islands were destroyed by their crews on 18 February before the detachment evacuated the Andamans, while the surviving two aircraft of the Burma-based detachment were evacuated to India on 26 February. 

In March 1942, the squadron had moved to Lahore to rebuild its strength, but in April it moved to Ranchi, in North-East India. In July, the squadron moved to its old base at Kohat for operations over the North-West Frontier, supporting operations by a mobile column of the Indian Army against followers of Mitza Ali Khan, who had cut the road between Miramshah and Datta Khel. Following the successful relief of Datta Khel and the dispersal of the rebels, the squadron returned to Ranchi in August. In December 1942 it was re-equipped with Hawker Hurricane IIb aircraft in the fighter-reconnaissance role. By January 1943 the squadron was operating over Burma, with detachments at Maungdaw and Imphal.  The Maungdaw-based detachment moved to Ramu, Cox's Bazar in April and to Cox's Bazar in May 1943. Operations included both tactical reconnaissance and high-level photo reconnaissance, together with offensive patrols against Japanese river traffic. The squadron flew at least 100 operational sorties per month throughout 1943, including during the Monsoon season. 

In March 1944, the squadron began to replace its machine-gun armed Hurricane IIbs with cannon-armed Hurricane IIcs, while the squadron's operational tempo picked up in the early part of the year, reaching 12 sorties per day in March, while in April it supplemented its normal duties with carrying mail between Dimapur and besieged Imphal during the Battles of Imphal and Kohima. The squadron was pulled out of the front line in July 1944, returning to operations over Burma in December that year. In May 1945, it started to receive Hurricane IVs to supplement its IIcs. On 1 August 1945, the squadron received three Supermarine Spitfire PR.XIs, flying a few sorties with them before the end of the war.

Post War
After the end of the Second World War the squadron continued as a fighter-reconnaissance unit as part of the Far East Air Force. In October 1945, the squadron replaced its Hurricanes with more Spitfires, (Mk VIIIs and Mk XIVEs), concentrating on the Spitfire XIVE by the end of the year. It moved to Penang, Malaya in November 1945 and to RAF Kuala Lumpur in April 1946, and then to RAF Tengah, Singapore in February 1947. The squadron received Spitfire FR.18s in 1947. It moved to RAF Sembawang, also in Singapore in February 1949. It moved to RAF Kai Tak, Hong Kong in 1949 still with Spitfires, in order to strengthen Hong Kong's defences as a result of the ongoing Chinese Civil War, with the squadron's role changing from fighter-reconnaissance to pure fighter. From then on the squadron was regularly moved between Kai Tak and Sek Kong. In February 1951, the squadron was re-equipped with jet aircraft, as de Havilland Vampire FB.5s replaced the Spitfires, with 28 Squadron being the last front-line RAF squadron equipped with the Spitfire. From February 1952, it began receiving Vampire FB.9s, which where fitted with air conditioning, which made operations in the hot climate of Hong Kong more tolerable for the pilots. In February 1956, the squadron discarded its Vampires, again being the last front-line RAF squadron to operate the type, receiving de Havilland Venom FB.1s as replacements, exchanging them for Venom FB.4s in November 1959. In June 1957, as a result of the 1957 Defence Review, Sek Kong was handed over the army, with 28 Squadron returning to Kai Tak. While at Kai Tak from May 1962 the squadron changed to flying Hawker Hunter FGA.9s, until 2 January 1967 when it was disbanded.

The squadron was reformed on 1 March 1968 at Kai Tak from a detachment of No. 103 Squadron RAF operating Westland Whirlwind HC 10s. The Westland Wessex HC.2 was introduced to the squadron from January 1972 and the Whirlwinds operated until August 1972. On 17 May 1978 the squadron moved to RAF Sek Kong and stayed until 1 November 1996. The squadron returned to Kai Tak from then until disbanded on 3 June 1997 prior to the British withdrawal on 1 July, with the squadron's Wessexes being sold to Uruguay. It was the last RAF squadron to leave the territory.

The RAF ordered 22 Westland Merlin HC3 helicopters in March 1995, the first of which was received from GKNWestland, now AgustaWestland, on 7 March 2001. The squadron officially reformed on 17 July 2001 at RAF Benson, the first time in its recent history that the squadron had been stationed in the UK.

The squadron's first operational role with the Merlin was in support of SFOR at Banja Luka, Bosnia and Herzegovina. The aircraft and personnel deployed on 1 April 2003, the same day that an initial operational capability was declared for the Merlin. The detachment ceased on 31 March 2004 and the squadron then began to prepare for operations in Iraq.

The squadron's commitment to Operation Telic began on 1 March 2005. Several aircraft and a mix of aircrew, engineers and support personnel from 28 (AC) Squadron and RAF Benson, deployed using the historic No. 1419 Flight RAF to replace the Chinooks of No. 1310 Flight RAF at Basrah Air Station, Iraq.

In 2009 the squadron returned from Operation Telic and later on in the year deployed on Operation Herrick keeping the designation of 1419 Flight. The squadron returned during May 2013. In July 2015, the squadron handed over its Merlin helicopters to 845 Naval Air Squadron and re-roled as 28 (R) Squadron OCU whose role is to train Chinook Mk4 and Puma Mk2 helicopters crews.

In March 2020, the squadron was awarded the right to emblazon a battle honour on its squadron standard, recognising its role in the War in Afghanistan between 2001 and 2014.

See also
List of Royal Air Force aircraft squadrons

References

Notes

Citations

Bibliography

External links

 28 Squadron RAF website

028
Military units and formations established in 1915
028 squadron
Military of Hong Kong under British rule
1915 establishments in the United Kingdom